If is the fourth studio album by Mindless Self Indulgence. It was released through The End Records on April 28, 2008 in the UK and on April 29, 2008 in the U.S.

Track listing
All songs written by James Euringer, except where noted.

Listing for standard and deluxe editions
 "Never Wanted to Dance" – 3:09
 "Evening Wear" – 3:32
 "Lights Out" (J. Euringer, Steve Montano) – 2:37
 "Prescription" – 3:06
 "Issues" (J. Euringer, S. Montano, Jennifer Dunn) – 3:05
 "Get It Up" (J. Euringer, S. Montano) – 2:36
 "Uncle" – 2:55 (Bonus track between "Get It Up" and "Revenge" on Censored edition)
 "Revenge" – 3:09
 "Animal" – 2:44
 "Mastermind" – 3:00
 "On It" – 3:02
 "Pay for It" – 3:34
 "Due" – 2:10
 "Money" – 2:53
 "Bomb This Track" – 3:20
 "Mark David Chapman" – 3:10

UK/Japanese edition bonus tracks
<li> "Uncle" – 2:55
<li> "3S'" – 2:27
<li> "Never Wanted to Dance" (The Birthday Massacre "Pansy Mix") – 3:31
<li> "Never Wanted to Dance" (Combichrist Electro Hurtz Mix) – 4:52
<li> "Never Wanted to Dance" (Tommie Sunshine [TSMV] Remix) – 7:13
<li> "Never Wanted to Dance" (Spider "Dub" Mix) – 7:52

Japanese edition bonus disc
 "Written in Cold Blood" (Mark Saunders Mix) – 2:33
 "Prove Me Wrong" – 4:04
 "Genius" – 2:29
 "On It" (Remix by KMFDM) – 3:33
 "On It" (Remix by Hollowboy) – 4:33
 "(It's 3AM) Issues" (Remix by Dinesh Boaz)
 "(It's 3AM) Issues" (Remix by Million Dollar Mano)
 "Pay for It" (Remix by M. Shawn Crahan, Clown from Slipknot/Dirty Little Rabbits) – 4:05
 "Pay for It" (Remix by Ulver) – 3:47
 "Never Wanted to Dance" (Ulrich Wild Remix) – 3:13
 "Never Wanted to Dance" (a cappella mix by The Birthday Massacre) – 2:37

Japanese edition bonus videos
 "Never Wanted to Dance" (Directed by Jim Berman)
 "Mark David Chapman" (Directed by Mike Dahlquist)
 The Making of "Mark David Chapman" (shot, cut, directed and narrated by Mike Dahlquist)

Deluxe edition bonus DVD contents
 "Stupid MF" (live)
 "Straight to Video" (live)
 "Animal" (live)
 "Tornado" (live)
 "Animal" (music video)

Listing for vinyl edition
Side A
 "Never Wanted to Dance"
 "Evening Wear"
 "Lights Out"
 "Revenge"

Side B
 "Animal"
 "Pay for It"
 "Due"
 "Money"
 "Mark David Chapman"

Side C
 "Issues"
 "Get It Up"
 "Prescription"

Side D
 "On It"
 "Bomb This Track"
 "Mastermind"

Music videos
"Animal"
Director: M dot Strange
"Mark David Chapman"
Director: Mike Dahlquist
Writers: Alex Morrison and Zak Keck
"Never Wanted to Dance"
Director: Jim Berman

References

Roadrunner Regarding MSI's change to The End Records and release date.
The End Records Official track listing and cover art for the album.
 April 2008 issue of Revolver
[ Billboard.com Discography] Regarding the Three singles (Pay For It, (It's 3AM) Issues, On It)
MSI's Music Page  Regarding the Three upcoming UK Never Wanted To Dance Singles and the Live Digital Download of Never Wanted To Dance
http://www.yesasia.com/us/if-japan-version/1014336994-0-0-0-en/info.html

Mindless Self Indulgence albums
2008 albums